Taylor Leon Coutu  (born March 10, 1987) is an American professional golfer currently playing on the LPGA Tour. She played under her maiden name, Taylor Leon, until her marriage in February 2012.

Amateur career
A native of Dallas, Texas, Leon was a two-time Rolex Junior Second-Team All-America, won two AJGA events, and represented the United States on the 2003 PING Junior Solheim Cup Team. She won the 2005 Pacific Northwest Golf Association Women's Amateur Championship and the 2006 Southern Amateur Championship. In 2006, she was a member of the U.S. Curtis Cup team.

Leon attended the University of Georgia for two years where she was a unanimous Southeastern Conference (SEC) Freshman of the Year selection and was named First-Team All-SEC in 2006. She was named a
National Golf Coaches Association (NGCA) First-Team All-American in both 2006 and 2007.

Professional career
Leon qualified for the Futures Tour while still an amateur in 2005. She turned professional in June 2007, and won two of the eight tournaments she entered that year on the Futures Tour, finishing high enough on the 2007 Futures Tour money list to earn non-exempt status on the LPGA Tour for the 2008 season. She entered LPGA Qualifying school in December 2008 in an attempt to earn full-time playing status for 2009. Finishing tied for 40th in the tournament, she missed the top-20th place cut-off finish necessary to earn a fully exempt Tour card. She retains playing membership on the Futures Tour as well as limited status on the LPGA Tour for the 2009 season.

In 2008, Leon signed an endorsement deal with Brooks Brothers, becoming the company's first-ever female brand ambassador for the Brooks Brothers Country Club Collection.

Professional wins (2)

Futures Tour (2) 
2007 (2) CIGNA Golf Classic, Betty Puskar Golf Classic

Results in LPGA majors

CUT = missed the half-way cut
"T" = tied

Team appearances
Amateur
Junior Solheim Cup (representing the United States): 2003
Curtis Cup (representing the United States): 2006 (winners)

References

External links

American female golfers
Georgia Bulldogs women's golfers
LPGA Tour golfers
Golfers from Dallas
1987 births
Living people